{{DISPLAYTITLE:D-Galacturonic acid}}

-Galacturonic acid is a sugar acid, an oxidized form of -galactose. It is the main component of pectin, in which it exists as the polymer polygalacturonic acid. In its open form, it has an aldehyde group at C1 and a carboxylic acid group at C6. Other oxidized forms of -galactose are -galactonic acid (carboxylic group at C1) and meso-galactaric acid (mucic acid) (carboxylic groups at C1 and C6). It is also a uronic acid or hexuronic acid. Naturally occurring uronic acids are -glucuronic acid, -galacturonic acid, -iduronic acid and -mannuronic acid.

References

Uronic acids